The European Junior Badminton Championships is a tournament organized by the Badminton Europe (BE) since 1969, and is held once every two years to crown the best junior badminton players in Europe. Team events were added to the program since the 1975 edition in Copenhagen, Denmark.

Championships

Past winners

Medal count (1969–2022)

External links
Badminton Europe: European Junior Championships-Individuals
Badminton Europe: European Junior Championships-Team

 
Youth badminton
1969 establishments in Europe
Recurring sporting events established in 1969